Sir Alfred Mellor Watkin, 2nd Baronet (11 August 1846 – 30 November 1914) was a Liberal Party politician and railway engineer.

Railway career
In 1863, around age 17, Watkin became an apprentice in the locomotive department of the West Midland Railway before being transferred the next year to the Manchester, Sheffield and Lincolnshire Railway where he qualified as an express engine driver. In 1866, he then became a locomotive inspector of the London, Chatham and Dover Railway, and the South Eastern Railway. He became a locomotive independent of the latter in 1873, director in 1878, and chairman of its locomotive committee of directors from 1880 to 1900.

Parliamentary career
He was elected Liberal MP for Great Grimsby at a by-election in 1877, gaining the seat from the Conservative Party. He did not attempt to retain the seat at the next election in 1880.

Baronetage
He became the 2nd Baronet of Rose Hill upon his father Edward Watkin's death in 1901, and the title became extinct upon his own death in 1914.

Other activities
During his life, Watkin was a Deputy Lieutenant of Middlesex, a Justice of the Peace, and a Chevalier of the Order of Leopold of Belgium.

References

External links
 

Liberal Party (UK) MPs for English constituencies
UK MPs 1874–1880
Deputy Lieutenants of Middlesex
1846 births
1914 deaths
Members of the Parliament of the United Kingdom for Great Grimsby
Baronets in the Baronetage of the United Kingdom